The Mutawintji National Park, formerly the Mootwingee National Park, is a protected national park that is located in the Far West region of New South Wales, in eastern Australia.

Features and location

The rugged, mulga-clad Byngnano Range is dissected by colourful gorges, rockpools and creek beds lined with red gums. Scattered among the caves and overhangs are Aboriginal rock art and engravings.

In 1979, the Foundation for National Parks & Wildlife purchased and fenced , in the Coturaundee Ranges, now part of Mutawintji National Park, for the conservation and protection of the yellow-footed rock wallaby.

Follow-up funding of fox eradication in the reserve ensured the survival of this last population of yellow-footed rock-wallabies in New South Wales. Of the wild animals, wedge-tailed eagle, peregrine falcon, short-billed correllas, zebra finches, budgerigars, apostle birds and magpies can also be found here.

The park also protects Mutawintji Historic Site, containing one of the best collections of Australian Aboriginal rock art.

See also

 Protected areas of New South Wales

References

Gallery

External links

 
 
 The Archaeology of Mootwingee,Western New South Wales by F. D. McCarthy and N. W. G. Macintosh. Records of the Australian Museum, VOL. XXV, No. 13, 1962, pp. 249–298.

National parks of New South Wales
Protected areas established in 1998
Rock art in Australia
1998 establishments in Australia
Far West (New South Wales)